This a complete list of townships in Ogle County, Illinois, USA.

Current townships

See also
Ogle County, Illinois
Township

References
Illinois Archives
Illinois Township Information

Geography of Ogle County, Illinois
Illinois, Ogle County